María Luisa Montoto de Rogel (born 28 March 1952) is an Argentine ophthalmologist and politician, currently serving as National Deputy elected in Santiago del Estero since 2019. She is a member of the Civic Front for Santiago (FCpS). She sits in the Frente de Todos parliamentary bloc.

Born in the city of Santiago del Estero, Montoto previously served as a councilwoman in the city council of La Banda from 2018 to 2019. She was the third alternate candidate in the FCpS list to the National Chamber of Deputies in the 2017 legislative election. In 2019, Claudia Ledesma Abdala, who had been elected as deputy in the FCpS list, was elected to the National Senate, and Montoto was sworn in to fill her vacancy. Montoto was elected in her own right in the 2021 legislative election as the third candidate in the FCpS list, which received 64.8% of the vote.

Montoto forms part of the parliamentary commissions on Science, Technology and Productive Innovation, Disabilities, Elderly People, Families and Childhood, and Social Action and Public Health. In 2020, she voted against the legalisation of abortion in Argentina.

References

External links
Profile on the official website of the Chamber of Deputies 

Living people
1952 births
Ophthalmologists
Members of the Argentine Chamber of Deputies elected in Santiago del Estero
Women members of the Argentine Chamber of Deputies
People from Santiago del Estero
21st-century Argentine politicians
21st-century Argentine women politicians